That Luang is the national symbol and most important religious monument of Laos. Vientiane's most important Theravada Buddhist festival, "Boun That Luang", is held here for three days during
the full moon of the twelfth lunar month (November).

The monument
 
The That Luang dates from 1566. It has been destroyed and ransacked and renovated numerous times. The site is sacred as the Lao believe that the stupa enshrines a relic of Buddha.

Festivities

Monks and laypeople from all over Laos congregate to celebrate the occasion with three days of religious ceremony followed by a week of festivities, day and night. The procession of laypeople begins at Wat Si Muang in the city center and proceeds to That Luang to make offerings to the monks in order to accumulate merit for rebirth into a better life. The religious part concludes as laypeople, carrying incense and candles as offerings, circulate That Luang three times in honor of Buddha. Folk and popular music troupes and drama performances provide entertainment at the festival.

Further reading
The Politics of Ritual and Remembrance : Laos Since 1975, by Grant Evans, University of Hawai'i Press (1998)
Ladwig, Patrice (2015). Worshipping relics and animating statues. Transformations of Buddhist statecraft in contemporary Laos. Modern Asian Studies Vol.49/6, 2015, pp. 1875–1902.

Buddhist festivals in Laos